Mudenbach is an Ortsgemeinde – a community belonging to a Verbandsgemeinde – in the Westerwaldkreis in Rhineland-Palatinate, Germany.

Geography

Location
The community lies in the northern Westerwald on the river Wied. The community is mainly agriculturally structured. It belongs to the Verbandsgemeinde of Hachenburg, a kind of collective municipality. Its seat is in the like-named town.

Constituent communities
Mudenbach has one outlying centre named Hanwerth.

History
In 1270, Mudenbach had its first documentary mention.

Politics

The municipal council is made up of 13 council members, including the extraofficial mayor (Bürgermeister), who were elected in a majority vote in a municipal election on 13 June 2004.

Economy and infrastructure

Mudenbach is linked to the long-distance transport network by Landesstraße 265 leading to Bundesstraße 8, which links the community to the middle centres of Hachenburg and Altenkirchen. The Autobahn interchanges Mogendorf and Dierdorf on the A 3 (Cologne–Frankfurt) can be reached by Bundesstraßen 8 and 413. The Hennef interchange on the A 5 (AS 60) can be reached directly by Bundesstraße 8.

References

External links
 Mudenbach 
 Mudenbach in the collective municipality’s Web pages 

Municipalities in Rhineland-Palatinate
Westerwaldkreis